Group C of the 2017 CONCACAF Gold Cup consisted of title holders Mexico, El Salvador, Curaçao, and Jamaica. Matches began on July 9 and ended on July 16, 2017.

Teams

Standings

In the quarter-finals:
The winners of Group C, Mexico, advanced to play the third-placed team of Group A, Honduras.
The runners-up of Group C, Jamaica, advanced to play the runners-up of Group A, Canada.
The third-placed team of Group C, El Salvador, advanced as one of the two best third-placed teams to play the winners of Group B, the United States.

Matches

Curaçao vs Jamaica

Mexico vs El Salvador

El Salvador vs Curaçao

Mexico vs Jamaica

Jamaica vs El Salvador

Curaçao vs Mexico

References

External links
 

Group C